NGC 3359 is a barred spiral galaxy located 59 million light-years from Earth, in the constellation of Ursa Major. It was discovered on November 28, 1793, by the astronomer William Herschel. The central bar is approximately 500 million years old.

NGC 3559 is "devouring" the much smaller galaxy, nicknamed the Little Cub.

Gallery

References

External links
 

Ursa Major (constellation)
3359
32183
17931128
Barred spiral galaxies